Harshit Pal  may refer to:
Harshit(Jhansi), Public Figure of the city of Jhansi
Harshit Pal (Gadariya), On instagram with over 9.5k + Followers .